Spencer Cecil Carpenter (3 November 1877 – 19 August 1959) was an Anglican priest and author. He was the Dean of Exeter in the Church of England from 1935 to 1950.

Carpenter  was educated at University College School and Gonville and Caius College, Cambridge. He was ordained in 1903  and began his ecclesiastical career with a curacy at St Paul's, Walworth. He was successively Vice-Principal of Westcott House, Cambridge; Warden of the Gonville and Caius College Mission in Battersea then Fellow and Tutor of  Selwyn College, Cambridge. From 1922 to 1930 he was Vicar and Rural Dean of St Peter's, Bolton.

In 1929, he became an Honorary Chaplain to the King. In 1930, he left Selwyn to become simultaneously Master of the Temple in London and Professor of Theology at  Queen's College, Harley Street. He retained all three positions until his appointment to the Deanery in 1935. In the same year, he also became Provost of King's College, Taunton, a position he held until 1953.

Works
A Parson’s Defence, 1912
Christianity according to St Luke, 1919
A Large Room, 1923
The Anglican Tradition, 1928
The Church and Politics, 1934
The Bible View of Life, 1937
Faith in Time of War, 1940
Exeter Cathedral, 1942
Life of Bishop Winnington-Ingram, 1949
The Church in England, 597–1688, 1954
Eighteenth Century Church and People, 1959

References

1877 births
People educated at University College School
Alumni of Gonville and Caius College, Cambridge
Fellows of Selwyn College, Cambridge
Honorary Chaplains to the King
Deans of Exeter
1959 deaths
Masters of the Temple
Staff of Westcott House, Cambridge